TYME ("Take Your Money Everywhere") is an ATM/interbank network in Florida, Wisconsin, and the Upper Peninsula of Michigan. It was one of the first shared EFT networks in the country.

Residents commonly referred to ATMs as a "TYME machine", which resulted in confusion when Wisconsinites visiting unfamiliar areas would ask the locals where they could find a "time machine".

History
In 1975, the TYPE network was created by an agreement among First Wisconsin National Bank, Marshall & Ilsley, Marine Bank of Milwaukee, and Midland National Bank.

In 2002, the TYME network merged with the Pulse network, taking the Pulse brand name in 2004 and retiring the old TYME identity.

As of the 2010s, the combined Pulse/TYME network included about 81,000 ATMs and 457,000 merchant point-of-sale locations. For the purposes of familiarity, some bank locations retained the former slot for the TYME signage and use a replacement slide with "ATM" rendered in the Neil Bold font used by TYME.

In 2022, Wisconsin-based Landmark Credit Union convinced Pulse to allow the use of the old TYME logo and brand identity for marketing their next-generation ATM machines.

See also
ATM usage fees

References

Bibliography

External links

Pulse EFT Association Official Website

Financial services companies established in 1975
Banking terms
Interbank networks
1975 establishments in the United States
Financial services companies of the United States